Michelle Watt (13 May 1977-24 June 2015) was a Scottish television presenter and interior designer. She was the daughter of Jim Watt, a former professional boxer and WBC world lightweight champion. Among the television shows she presented were the Junior Eurovision musical contest,  STV Appeal, the National Lottery Daily Play, the Live New Year Show, 60 Minute Makeover and  Club Cupid.

Watt was also a newspaper columnist for The Scottish Sun newspaper.

Biography 
Watt was born in 1977, the daughter of Jim, a boxing world lightweight champion, and Margaret Watt.  When Watt was 18 years old, in 1995, she and her family suffered the loss of her brother, Jim Jr., one year her junior, in a car accident.
 
In 2008, Watt became one of the hosts of "60 Minute Makeover" on the ITV television channel.

On 24 June 2015, Watt died by suicide. She was experiencing pain following a surgical procedure. Watt had been suffering from headaches and blackouts when she visited an eye doctor for tests in 2014; after being told she needed to go to a hospital immediately, she was given CAT scans and MRI tests, which showed she had calcium deposits on her optical nerve. A lumbar puncture operation was performed to discover the root of her medical condition, a procedure her father later disclosed that she had done despite the Watts' supposed knowledge that actor George Clooney had been suicidal after having one performed on him.

Personal life 
Watt first met her husband, Paul Kerr, when she was 14. The two had a daughter who was five years old when Watt died.

She lived in Airth, Stirlingshire.

References 

1977 births
2015 deaths
Scottish television presenters
Scottish women television presenters
Female suicides